This article is a catalog of actresses and models who have appeared on the cover of Elle Australia, the Australian edition of Elle magazine.

1990

1991

1992

1993

1994

1995

1996

1997

1998

1999

2013

2014

2015

2016

2017

2018

2019

2020

External links
 Elle Australia
 Elle Australia at Models.com

Australia